Reaching for the Sky is the second album by soul vocalist  Peabo Bryson.

Reception

Released in 1978, Reaching for the Sky would be Bryson's debut album on Capitol Records, charting with Quiet Storm staple "Feel the Fire" at number 13 on the R&B singles chart. This tune would be covered by Stephanie Mills in 1979 on her What Cha' Gonna Do with My Lovin' album and again in 1980 by Teddy Pendergrass as a duet with Mills on his TP album.  The midtempo title track, "Reaching for the Sky" was even more commercially successful, reaching number 6 on the R&B chart.

Track listing
All songs written by Peabo Bryson

"Reaching for the Sky" - 4:56   	
"Feel the Fire" - 5:03 	
"A Fool Already Knows" - 4:02 	
"Hold On to the World" - 4:41 	
"Love from Your Heart" - 5:22 	
"Love Walked Out on Me" - 5:36 	
"You Haven't Learned About Love" - 3:32 	
"Have a Good Time" - 4:58

Personnel 
 Peabo Bryson – lead and backing vocals
 Paul Libman – keyboards
 Terry Fryer – Moog synthesizer
 Ross Traut – lead guitar, guitar solo (7)
 Danny Leake – rhythm guitar
 Larry Ball – bass
 Morris Jennings – drums, percussion
 Bobby Christian – vibraphone, percussion, bells
 Sonny Seals – saxophone solo (8)
 Richard Evans – arrangements
 Dr. Warric Carter – horn and string arrangements, conductor 
 Johnny Pate – rhythm arrangements and conductor
 Jynean Bell – backing vocals
 Chuck Colbert – backing vocals
 Sharon Johnson – backing vocals
 Cynthia White – backing vocals

Production 
 Producers – Peabo Bryson and Richard Evans
 Executive Producer – Larkin Arnold
 Recorded by Bob Brooks, Harry Brotman, Zollie Johnson, Barney Perkins, Jim Scheffler, Paul Serrano and Stu Walters.
 Recorded and Mixed at P.S. Recording Studios (Chicago, IL).
 Mastered by Ken Perry at Capitol Records (Hollywood, CA).
 Art Direction – Roy Kohara
 Design – Art Sims
 Photography – Dick Zimmerman

Charts

Weekly charts

Year-end charts

Singles

Certifications

External links
 Peabo Bryson-Reaching for the Sky at Discogs

References

1978 albums
Peabo Bryson albums
Albums conducted by Johnny Pate
Capitol Records albums